The Portuguese Roman Catholic Diocese of Porto (Oporto) is a suffragan of the archdiocese of Braga. Its see at Porto is in the Norte region, and the second largest city in Portugal.

History 
The diocese was probably founded in the middle of the sixth century. At the third Council of Toledo (589) the Arian bishop Argiovittus, though he condemned the Arian belief and accepted the Catholic belief, was deposed in favour of bishop Constantinus. In 610 Bishop Argebertus assisted at the Council of Toledo, summoned by King Gundemar to sanction the metropolitan claims of Toledo. Bishop Ansiulfus was present at the Sixth Council of Toledo (638), and Bishop Flavius at the Tenth (656).

Bishop Froaricus was one of eight bishops who attended the provincial council of Braga (675), and the Twelfth (681), Thirteenth (683), and Fifteenth (688) Councils of Toledo. His successor Felix appeared at the Sixteenth Council (693). No other bishop is recorded under the Visigothic monarchy.

Arab occupation
In 716 the Arabs began their invasion and conquest of Portugal, including Lisbon, Porto, Braga, Tuy, Lugo, and Orense. The areas were depopulated. After the Arab invasion Justus seems to have been the first bishop (c. 882). He is only a name. Gomado was probably elected in 872, when King Affonso III won back the city. The names of only four other prelates have been preserved: Froarengus (906), Hermogius (912), Hordonius (attested in 931), and Didacus (Diego) (c. 962?).

Porto fell again into Moorish hands.

Restoration
On the recovery of Porto for Christianity, which was being promoted by the Burgundian Count Henry, son-in-law of King Alfonso VI of Castile and governor of the lands from the Minho River to the banks of the Tagus, priests and prelates were being imported, especially those with connections to Cluny in Burgundy. Hugo (Hugh) became bishop (1114-1136). He had been a Canon of the Cathedral of Compostella, and under the patronage of Bishop Diego Gelmirez, a Cluniac, he was said to have been a co-author of the Historia Compostellana. In 1103-1104 he was sent to Rome on an embassy for the Church of Compostella, and obtained a bull granting numerous privileges, one of which was the right of the Bishop of Compostella to name Cardinals of Compostella. Hugo became a Cardinal. In 1109 he was Archdeacon of Compostella, but at the time of his election to the diocese of Porto and not yet ordained. He was ordained a priest on the day before Passion Sunday, and was consecrated a bishop on 23 March 1113 by Archbishop Mauricio Burdino of Braga, another Cluniac. As Bishop of Porto he secured from Pope Paschal II, by a bull granted on 15 August 1115, exemption of his diocese from the supervisory control of the Archbishop of Braga. He greatly enlarged his diocese and the cathedral patrimony increased by the donations he secured; thus, in 1120, he received from D. Theresa jurisdiction over the City of Porto with all the rents and dues thereof. Bishop Hugo was present at the Council of Compostella in 1114, the Council of Sagunto in 1121 (under the presidency of Cardinal Boso, the papal Legate), and the Synod of Compostella in 1122.

John Peculiar was promoted to Braga (1138), his nephew, Pedro Rabaldis, succeeding at Porto. Next came D. Pedro Pitões (1145 to 1152 or 1155), D. Pedro Sénior (d. 1172), and D. Fernão Martins (d. 1185). Martinho Pires instituted a chapter and was promoted to Braga in 1189 or 1190. Martinho Rodrigues ruled from 1191 to 1235. He quarreled with the chapter over their share of the rents of the see. Later on, fresh disagreements arose in which King Sancho I intervened against the bishop, who was deprived of his goods and had to flee, but was restored by the king when Innocent III espoused the bishop's cause. Another quarrel soon arouse between prelate and king, and the bishop was imprisoned; but he escaped and fled to Rome, and in 1209 the king, feeling the approach of death, made peace with him. His successor, Pedro Salvadores, figured prominently in the questions between the clergy and King Sancho II, who refused to ecclesiastics the right of purchasing or inheriting land. Portugal fell into anarchy, in which the clergy's rights were violated and their persons outraged, though they themselves were not guiltless. Finally, Pope Innocent IV committed the reform of abuses to Afonso III, brother of Sancho II who lost his crown.

Under Bishop Julian (1247–60) the jurisdiction difficulty became aggravated. A settlement was effected at the Cortes of Leiria (1254), which the bishop refused to ratify, but he had to give way. When King Afonso III determined (1265) that all rights and properties usurped during the disorders of Sancho's reign should revert to the Crown, nearly all the bishops, including the Bishop of Porto, then D. Vicente, protested; and seven went to Rome for relief, leaving Portugal under an interdict. When the king was dying, in 1278, he promised restitution. Vicente (d. 1296) was one of the negotiators of the Concordat of 1289 and the supplementary Accord of Eleven Articles. He was succeeded by Sancho Pires, who ruled until 1300. Geraldo Domingues resigned in 1308 to act as counsellor of the King's daughter Constança, future Queen of Castile. Tredulo was bishop for two and a half years. The Minorite Frei Estêvão was succeeded in 1313 by his nephew Fernando Ramires. Both uncle and nephew quarrelled with King Denis and left the realm.

Owing to the hostility of the citizens, Bishop Gomes lived mostly outside his diocese. When Pedro Afonso became bishop in 1343, he had a quarrel over jurisdiction and, like his predecessor, departed, leaving the diocese under interdict. Six years later he returned, but again the monarch began to encroach, and it was not until 1354 that the bishop secured recognition of his rights. His successor was Afonso Pires. Egídio is probably the bishop represented in the old Chronicles as being threatened with scourging by King Pedro for having lived in sin with a citizen's wife The accusation was probably groundless, but Egídio left the city, which for twelve years had no bishop.

Other bishops were: John de Zambuja, or Estêvão; and Gil, who in 1406 sold the episcopal rights over Oporto to the Crown for an annual money payment, reduced in the reign of D. Manuel to 120 silver marks; Fernando Guerra, who in 1425 was created Archbishop of Braga; and Vasco. Antão Martins de Chaves, who succeeded Vasco in 1430, was sent by the pope to Constantinople to induce the Greek emperor to attend the Council of Basle. He succeeded, and as a reward was made cardinal. He died in 1447. Succeeding incumbents were: Durando; Gonçalves de Óbidos; Luis Pires (1454–64), a negotiator of the Concordat of 1455 and a reforming prelate; João de Azevedo (1465–1494), a benefactor of the cathedral and chapter, as was his successor Diego de Sousa, afterwards Archbishop of Braga and executor of King Manuel I. The see was then held by two brothers in succession, Diogo da Costa (1505-7) and D. Pedro da Costa (1511–39), who restored the bishop's palace and enriched the capitular revenues from his own purse; Belchior Beliago; and the Carmelite Frei Baltazar Limpo (1538–52), the fiftieth bishop. He held a diocesan synod in 1540.

In the time of Rodrigo Pinheiro, a learned humanist, Porto was visited by St. Francis Borgia and the Jesuits established themselves in the city. Aires da Silva, ex-rector of Coimbra University, after ruling four years, fell in the battle of Alcácer Quibir in 1578 with King Sebastião. Simão Pereira was followed by the Franciscan Frei Marcos de Lisboa, chronicler of his order. He added to the cathedral and convoked a diocesan synod in 1585. In 1591 another ex-rector of Coimbra, Jerónimo de Menezes, became bishop; he was succeeded by the Benedictine Frei Gonçalo de Morais, a zealous defender of the rights of the Church. He built a new sacristy and chancel in the cathedral. In 1618 Bishop Rodrigo da Cunha, author of the history of the Bishops of Oporto, was appointed. His "Catalogo" describes the state of the cathedral and enumerates the parishes of the diocese with their population and income in 1623 and is the earliest account we possess. His successor was Frei João de Valadares, transferred from the See of Miranda. Gaspar do Rego da Fonseca held the see four years (1635–39). King Philip III named Francisco Pereira Pinto, but the revolution in 1640 prevented his taking possession; moreover he never received his bulls of consecration and installation from Pope Urban VIII, and therefore he could not be consecrated or installed as bishop. The diocese was considered vacant until 1670, being ruled by administrators appointed by the Chapter of the Cathedral (Vicars capitular). In 1641 King John IV chose D. Sebastião César de Menezes as bishop, but the pope, influenced by Spain, would neither recognize the new King of Portugal nor confirm his nominations. Next came Frei Pedro de Menezes; Nicolau Monteiro took possession in 1671; and Fernando Correia de Lacerda in 1673, who was succeeded by João de Sousa. Frei José Saldanha (1697–1708), famed for his austerity, never relinquished his Franciscan habit, a contrast to his successor Tomás de Almeida, who in 1716 became the first Patriarch of Lisbon. The see remained vacant until 1739, and, though Frei John Maria was then elected, he never obtained confirmation. In the same year Frei José Maria da Fonseca, formerly Commissary General of the Franciscans, became bishop. Several European States selected him as arbiter of their differences. He contributed to the canonization of a number of saints, and founded and restored many convents and hospitals.

Next in order were: Frei António de Távora (d. 1766), Frei Aleixo de Miranda Henriques, Frei João Rafael de Mendonça (1771–73), and Lourenço Correia de Sá Benevides (1796–98). Frei Antonio de Castro became Patriarch of Lisbon in 1814, being followed at Porto by João Avelar. Frei Manuel de Santa Inês, though elected, never obtained confirmation, but some years after his death, relations between Portugal and the Holy See were re-established by a concordat and Jerónimo da Costa Rebelo became bishop in 1843. From 1854 to 1859 the see was held by António da Fonseca Moniz; on his death it remained vacant until 1862, when João de Castro e Moura, who had been a missionary in China, was appointed (d.1868). The see was again vacant until the confirmation of Américo Ferreira dos Santos Silva in 1871. This prelate was obliged to combat the growing Liberalism of his flock and the Protestant propaganda in Porto. A popular lawyer named Mesquita started a campaign against him, because the bishop refused to dismiss some priests; a reputed reactionary, who served the Aguardente Chapel, got himself elected judge of the Brotherhood of the Temple and provoked a great platform agitation with the result that the chapel was secularized and became a school under the patronage of the Marquis of Pombal Association. In 1879 Américo was created cardinal and on his death (1911) Bishop António Barroso, an ex-missionary, was transferred from the see of Mylapore to that of Porto.

Cathedral
The Porto Cathedral was dedicated to the Assumption of the Blessed Virgin Mary into Heaven. It had a Chapter, a corporation composed of eight dignities (not dignitaries) and twelve Canons. The dignities included: the Dean, the Cantor, the Master of the Schola, the Theologus and the Archdeacon of Porto. On 9 September 1455 Bishop Luis Pires (1453-1464) instituted a second Archdeacon, the Archdeacon of Oliveira.

Bishops 

Partial list of the bishops of Porto. Bishops who were later elevated to the rank of cardinal are shown in bold typeface.

from 1100 to 1400

from 1400 to 1700

from 1700 to present

See also
 Porto history and timeline

References

Bibliography
 Almeida, Fortunato da (1917). História da igreja em Portugal, Volume 3, parte 2. Coimbra: Imprensa académica, 1917.
  
 Pedro Sainz de Barada, "Clave de la España Sagrada," Coleccion de Documentos Ineditos para la Historia de Espana Tomo XXII (Madrid 1853), pp. 110–113. [Bishops, 1766–1852]
 
 
  
 Mattoso, José (1968). Le monachisme ibérique et Cluny: les monastères du diocèse de Porto de l'an mille à 1200. Louvain: Publications de l'Université de Louvain, 1968.

Episcopal lists
  (Use with caution; obsolete)
  (in Latin) 
 (in Latin) 
 
 
 

History of Porto
Religion in Porto
 
Roman Catholic dioceses in Portugal
Porto, Roman Catholic Diocese of